Frederiksberg Allé station is an underground  Copenhagen Metro station located at the corner of Frederiksberg Allé and Platanvej in the Frederiksberg area of Copenhagen, Denmark. It is on the City Circle Line (M3), between Enghave Plads and Frederiksberg, and is in fare zone 1.

History
The station was opened on 29 September 2019 together with 16 other stations of the line.

Design
The station is located beneath a building designed by Cobe.

Service

References

City Circle Line (Copenhagen Metro) stations
Railway stations opened in 2019
2019 establishments in Denmark
Railway stations in Denmark opened in the 21st century